Leryn Dahiana Franco Steneri (born 1 March 1982 in Asunción) is a Paraguayan model, actress and former athlete who currently works for the athletics department of Club Sol de América. Franco participated at the 2004, 2008 and 2012 Olympics competing in the javelin throw.

On 8 June 2012, Franco achieved a personal best throw of 57.77 m in Barquisimeto, Venezuela at the 2012 Ibero-American Championships in Athletics. Her achievement also became the new national record, having surpassed the previous record of 55.66 m, which Franco threw at the 2011 South American Championships in Athletics.

In 2013, she was cast in Irish film Eliza Lynch: Queen of Paraguay, portraying the role of the younger Eliza Lynch.

Athletics
On 3 September 2002, she broke her own javelin throw record reaching 51 metres in an international tournament contested in São Caetano, Brasil.

Modeling and beauty pageants
Franco appeared in the 2011 Sports Illustrated Swimsuit Issue. She has competed in several beauty pageants. In 2006, she was runner-up Miss Universo Paraguay 2006. She participated in the Miss Bikini of the Universe pageant. Franco has her own calendar, which was photographed in 2007 by Martin Crespo.

Personal life
Franco's parents were born in Uruguay and she is a fan of Olimpia in Paraguay and Peñarol in Uruguay. Franco played football before pursuing javelin. She is also a graduate in Business Administration.

Acting career
In 2013, Franco was cast for the role of Younger Eliza Lynch in the film which was filmed in Paraguay, Argentina, Brazil, France, England and Ireland. Film Ireland described Franco's performance as "beautifully captures the spirit of a young Eliza Lynch".

Film

Personal bests
 Javelin throw: 57.77 m NR –  Barquisimeto, 8 June 2012

Competition record

International competitions

National championships

Seasonal bests
IAAF Profile
1999 - 43.56 
2000 - 46.50 
2001 - 47.28
2002 - 51.81 
2003 - 53.09 
2004 - 54.68
2005 - 49.78
2007 - 55.38 
2008 - 53.34
2010 - 50.98 
2011 - 55.66
2012 - 57.77 (NR)
2013 - 55.68
2014 - 52.86

References

External links
 
 
 
 
 

1982 births
Living people
Paraguayan javelin throwers
Athletes (track and field) at the 2004 Summer Olympics
Athletes (track and field) at the 2008 Summer Olympics
Athletes (track and field) at the 2012 Summer Olympics
Athletes (track and field) at the 2003 Pan American Games
Athletes (track and field) at the 2007 Pan American Games
Athletes (track and field) at the 2011 Pan American Games
Olympic athletes of Paraguay
Paraguayan female models
Paraguayan film actresses
Pan American Games competitors for Paraguay
World Athletics Championships athletes for Paraguay
Female javelin throwers
Sportspeople from Asunción
Paraguayan female athletes
Paraguayan people of Uruguayan descent